Ultra Prime Esports, formed in 2020 by Nenking Group, is a professional esports franchise based in China. Ultra Prime Esports manages Nenking's esports teams, such as Guangzhou Charge.

History 
Nenking established a new esports brand "Ultra Prime" for Nenking's esports business on 28 August 2020. Ultra Prime Esports manages Nenking's esports teams, such as Guangzhou Charge of the Overwatch League.
On 17 December 2020, Nenking acquired the LPL team of the Chinese esports franchise "eStar Gaming".
On 29 March 2021, Nenking Esports Center had its grand opening. Located in GBA International Sports and Cultural Center, Nenking Esports Center will be the base of Ultra Prime Esports and all of Nenking's esports teams. Nenking also announced that "eStar Gaming", their League of Legends branch, had been rebranded to "Ultra Prime".

Teams

Guangzhou Charge (OWL)

Ultra Prime Academy (OWC)
On 8 August 2020, Nenking acquired an OWC team called "Ignition One (IO)"  and rebranded the team to Ultra Prime Academy as the academy team of Guangzhou Charge.

Ultra Prime (LPL) 
On 17 December 2020, LPL team eStar was acquired by Nenking. It was later renamed as "Ultra Prime" during the grand opening of Nenking Esports Center on 29 March 2021.

References 

 

Nenking Group
Guangzhou Charge
Overwatch League academy teams
League of Legends Pro League teams
Esports teams based in China
Esports teams established in 2021